Eva Wilder McGlasson Brodhead (1870-1915) was a nineteenth-century American novelist, author and contributor to Harper's Magazine. She is best known for her 1891 book Diana's Livery, which is set in a hypothetical Shaker community and discusses themes of utopianism, gender separation and all-woman spheres.

Bibliography
Diana's Livery (1891)
An Earthly Paragon (1892)
Ministers of Grace (1894)
One of the Visconti (1896)
Bound in Shallows (1897)
A Prairie Infanta (1904)

References

19th-century American women writers
1870 births
1915 deaths